"Oh Babe, What Would You Say" is a song by record producer Hurricane Smith, written by his wife Eileen Sylvia Smith, and released in 1972. It was a transatlantic hit; and became a United States #1 Cash Box and a Billboard Pop #3 hit, #3 in the Canadian RPM Magazine top singles, and  #4 in the UK Singles Chart.

Charts

Weekly charts

Year-end charts

Other versions
Cass Elliot, in the summer of 1972, on her album The Road Is No Place for a Lady.
Liza Minnelli, for her 1973 album The Singer.
 Popular Italian trumpeter and singer Nini Rosso recorded the song as a single in September 1972.
 A modified rendition was recorded by Carroll O'Connor and Jean Stapleton for the album "Archie and Edith Side by Side" in 1973.

See also
 List of 1970s one-hit wonders in the United States

References

1972 singles
1972 songs
Hurricane Smith songs
Cass Elliot songs
Cashbox number-one singles